Association of Pharmaceutical Teachers of India (APTI) is an organisation of academics in India who teach in the area of pharmacy. It was established in 1966 by Prof. M. L. Schroff, Prof G.P. Srivastava and others of pharmacy colleges of those days.

Association of Pharmaceutical Teachers of India publishes popular scientific journal called Indian Journal of Pharmaceutical Education and Research.

Indian Journal of Pharmacy Practice is also another official journal of APTI

State Branches of APTI 

 APTI have 21 State Branches as follows
 Andhra Pradesh
 Assam
 Chhattisgarh
 Goa
 Gujarat
 Haryana
 Himachal
 Jharkhand
 Karnataka
 Kerala
 Madhya Pradesh
 Maharashtra
 New Delhi
 Orissa
 Punjab
 Rajasthan
 Tamil Nadu
 Telangana
 Uttar Pradesh
 Uttarkhand
 West Bengal

References

External links 

1966 establishments in Mysore State
Pharmacy education in India
Educational organisations based in India
Organizations established in 1966